Dale Van Atta (born 1951) is a speaker, novelist, and journalist.  He was a personal friend of and co-author with fellow journalist Jack Anderson and borrowed money to help him when he was in financial trouble.  In 2008 his book With Honor was released about Melvin Robert Laird, Richard Nixon's Secretary of Defense from 1969 to 1973.

Career
Before joining Jack Anderson in 1979, Van Atta was an investigative reporter for Deseret News. He is also a contributor to many international and national magazines and newspapers. Van Atta worked with Jack Anderson for seven years writing a column in more than 800 newspapers.

Honors and awards
Van Atta has been nominated five times for the Pulitzer Prize. Three of the nominations came from his work at Deseret News from 1973 to 1979.

Works 
 Van Atta, Dale (2019). Bill Marriott: Success Is Never Final—his Life and the Decisions That Built a Hotel Empire . Shadow Mountain Publishing. ISBN 978-1629726007

References

External links 
Q and A with Dale Van Atta, an LDS Expert on Terrorism from Meridian Magazine
Press kit for With Honor
Author page at Harper's Magazine
Ford Library link for a set of documents that Mr. Van Atta donated

1952 births
21st-century American novelists
American male novelists
American male journalists
Living people
20th-century American novelists
20th-century American journalists
20th-century American male writers
21st-century American male writers
21st-century American non-fiction writers